Kenneth Muse (July 26, 1910 – July 26, 1987) was an American animator best known for his work on the Tom and Jerry series at MGM.

Biography 
Muse worked briefly at Walt Disney Productions, where he was Preston Blair's assistant on Fantasia (he helped animate "The Sorcerer's Apprentice" scenes). He also provided animation for Pinocchio ("I've Got No Strings" sequence), Fantasia and various Mickey Mouse cartoons such as Mr. Mouse Takes a Trip (1940), Mickey's Birthday Party (1942) and Symphony Hour (1942).

Muse left Disney following the 1941 strike there and joined MGM's animation department in 1941, along with fellow animators Preston Blair, Ed Love, Walter Clinton, Don Williams, Claude Smith and Berny Wolf He was assigned to the Hanna – Barbera unit, where he remained for 17 years. He first provided animation for the eighth Tom and Jerry short, Fine Feathered Friend (1942), and would remain an animator on the series until its final Hanna-Barbera-directed entry, Tot Watchers, in 1958. Muse also animated Jerry Mouse dancing with a live-action Gene Kelly in the 1945 musical Anchors Aweigh (and became archive footage as Jerry's visible in Family Guy episode, "Road to Rupert").

When MGM closed their animation studio in 1957, Muse joined his former bosses at their new company, Hanna-Barbera. He was one of the most prolific animators working for Hanna-Barbera's classic period of the late 1950s and early 1960s. He animated many important shows and sequences, including all of the short pilot The Flagstones, from which The Flintstones series was sold, as well as the original opening and closing titles of the series (the instrumental "Rise and Shine" titles, seen in the first two seasons, rather than the later, more familiar "Meet the Flintstones" titles). Muse also animated all of the first-produced episode of the series, "The Swimming Pool" (during the first season, episodes were assigned to one animator, who had only about four weeks each to complete them). Other early episodes animated entirely by Muse include "Hot Lips Hannigan","No Help Wanted", "The Monster From The Tar Pits", and "The Tycoon" (the J.L. Gotrocks episode). Muse also animated the opening and closing titles for Top Cat (1961). Over a period of three decades, he provided animation for nearly all of Hanna-Barbera's animated television series, including The Huckleberry Hound Show (1958), The Yogi Bear Show (1961), Top Cat (1961), The Jetsons (1962), Wacky Races (1968), Hong Kong Phooey (1974), Jabberjaw (1976), and Challenge of the Super Friends (1978).

Muse was the stepfather of singer-songwriter Judee Sill, with whom he had a strained relationship.

Death 
Muse died on July 26, 1987, his 77th birthday, in Templeton, California.

References

External links 
 
Obituary at the New York Times

1910 births
1987 deaths
American animators
Walt Disney Animation Studios people
Hanna-Barbera people
People from North Carolina
Metro-Goldwyn-Mayer cartoon studio people